Ramil de Jesus is a Filipino volleyball coach who is the head coach of the De La Salle University women's volleyball team. De Jesus has won 11 championship titles and 7 runner-up finishes in the UAAP as head coach of the De La Salle University women's volleyball team. He was also the head coach of the professional club team, F2 Logistics Cargo Movers, from 2016 to 2021, where he tallied 5 championship titles with 4 runners-up finish and 2 bronze medal.

Coaching record

References

Filipino volleyball coaches
Volleyball coaches of international teams
Living people
Year of birth missing (living people)